Westby may refer to:
England
 Westby, Lancashire
 Westby, Lincolnshire
U.S.A.
 Westby, Montana
 Westby, North Dakota
 Westby, Wisconsin
Australia
 Westby, New South Wales